The 2008 World Modern Pentathlon Championships were held in Budapest, Hungary from May 29 to June 3. It was the last Olympic qualification event in modern pentathlon before the 2008 Summer Olympics in Beijing.

Medal summary

Men's events

Women's events

See also
Modern Pentathlon at the 2008 Summer Olympics
World Modern Pentathlon Championship
Article in Hungarian with detailed results 
World Modern Pentathlon Championship Official Site

Modern pentathlon in Europe
World Modern Pentathlon Championship
World Modern Pentathlon Championship
International sports competitions hosted by Hungary
International sports competitions in Budapest